A final examination is a test given to students at the end of a course of study or training. 

Final examination or Final exam may also refer to:

Final Exam (album), seventh album by Loudon Wainwright III
Final Exam (1981 film), slasher film
Final Exam (2017 film), an Iranian drama film
"Final Exam" (Teen Titans), an episode of Teen Titans
"Final Exam" (The Outer Limits), a 1998 episode of The Outer Limits
Final Exam (video game), a 2013 side-scroller video game
Final Exam: A Surgeon's Reflections on Mortality, a 2007 book by Pauline Chen
Final Examination (film), 2003 film directed by Fred Olen Ray